Mawdoo3, (in  ; literally "Subject") is an online Arabic content publisher, based in Jordan. Mawdoo3 was initially established in 2010 by Mohammad Jaber and Rami Al Qawasmi, and officially launched in 2012. The company claims to be the world's largest Arabic website.

The company expanded its online Arabic content with over 140k articles to date. In 2011, it won the first prize for the Queen Rania National Entrepreneurship Award for the category of universities and academics in 2011.

In March 2018, Mawdoo3 also launched an Arabic speaking digital assistant called “Salma”.

History

Establishment 
The Idea of Mawdoo3 began with Mohammed Jaber, who, when he was studying at the Hashemite University in Jordan, said: "The idea of the project came in late 2009 from reading a book about e-marketing during my summer vacation, which prompted me to read further. I bought three specialized books and read them, which revealed to me the opportunity to build a project to develop a keyword analysis service in Arabic".

In 2010, Jaber and Rami al-Qawasmi founded Mawdoo3 with their private money and that of family and friends. The startup won the first prize for the Queen Rania Business Plan Competition Award in 2011, while the founders were still students. It was launched in 2010.

Investments and partnerships 
In August 2015, Mawdoo3 announced that it had received $1.5 million in Series A funding from Dubai based investor “EquiTrust” (Choueiri Group former corporate investment arm), as a result of a remarkable increase in the traffic with more than 20 million visits per month, of which 12 million are unique with a majority of the traffic coming from Saudi Arabia, followed by Egypt and Jordan.This funding was to be invested in supporting Arabic content and increasing the number of Arabic pages on the Internet as per the announcement.

In addition, Mawdoo3 entered into partnerships with a number of publishers and institutions to provide them with high quality content, such as Mutah University, Queen Rania Center for Entrepreneurship, the Islamic World Academy of Sciences, Medical Reference Altibbi, and the technical Arabic Dictionary "".

In July 2018, Mawdoo3 announced that it had received $13.5 million in their series B round of funding, led by U.K.-based Kingsway along with U.S.-based Endure Capital. In 2018, Mawdoo3 generated 289,000 USD in revenue.

Growth 
In early 2016, with approximately 17 Million users, Mawdoo3 became the most popular website in Arabic.

In early 2017, Mawdoo3 AI was founded, A fine-tech division of Mawdoo3 with a mission of creating an Arabic speaking conversational agent that answers factoid questions.

In 2018, Mawdoo3 announced reaching 45M unique users, achieving a growth rate of approximately 43% of what they have in 2016.

AI 
In March 2018, Mawdoo3 launched its beta web services of the most comprehensive Arabic NLP toolkit for developers (ai.mawdoo3.com). The API-based developer library exceeds state of the art accuracy in most of the NLP tasks including but not limited to: Automatic diacritization, named entity recognition, coreference resolution, sentiment analysis and Arabic text to speech.

Mawdoo3 NLP toolkit was designed to serve as building components of Mawdoo3 Arabic speaking digital assistant, Salma, that answers factoid questions from Mawdoo3 platform. Salma is planned also to be provided as an Arabic voice interface service for enterprises in sectors like travel, automobile, telecom and electronics.

The way it works 
Mawdoo3 uses the wiki system, but unlike Wikipedia, Mawdoo3.com adopts a more centralized operation model to create and upload content. The team is composed of 20 full-time employees, as well as hundreds of writers divided into paid experts and contributors, who write on specific topics according to special content strategy. It publishes original informational articles and rejects opinion, news, and promotional pieces. Prior to publishing, an in-house auditing team verifies the content of every article for plagiarism, and checks for correct language use. Translated articles are also welcome.

Statistics

Visitors 
According to the Alexa website (July, 2018), the distribution of the Arab visitors is as follow:

References 

Internet properties established in 2012
Jordanian online encyclopedias
MediaWiki websites
Arabic-language encyclopedias
21st-century encyclopedias
Jordanian companies established in 2012